Oğuz Han Aynaoğlu (born 22 March 1992), also known as OG, is a Danish footballer who plays as a winger for Turkish club Balıkesirspor. He has amassed a total 11 youth caps for Denmark under three different age groups.

Early life
Oğuzhan played football during his youth for Brøndby, until he moved to F.C. Nordsjælland.

Senior career

F.C. Nordsjælland
On 25 May 2011, Oğuzhan made his debut for the F.C. Nordsjælland first team, coming on as a substitute for Tobias Mikkelsen against his former club Brøndby, at Brøndby Stadium. The match ended in a 1–1 draw. He played two games in spring 2011, before getting promoted to the first team squad in summer 2011.

His two next season didn't offer him much time on the pitch, as he only played one league game in 2011/12 and seven in 2012/13, before getting sold in January 2014. His suffered from some injuries in his last season, where he got many games in the fall.

Bursaspor
On 5 January 2014 it was confirmed, that Aynaoğlu was sold to Turkish club Bursaspor. He played nine games for Adanaspor in the first half season.

Loan to Adana Demirspor
Bursaspor got a new board and manager after OG's first season in the club, and after only a half season at Bursaspor, he was loaned out to Adana Demirspor. OG later revealed, that the new board and manager hadn't see him play or train, but just suddenly decided to loan him out. So the loan stay was decided without his accept. OG quickly became a regular part of the squad and was very happy with his breakthrough in Turkish football. He played 40 games for the club and scored six goals in total, before he returned to Bursaspor.

Back in Bursaspor
OG was ready to new start at Bursaspor after a successful season at Adana. According to OG, had Bursaspor told him that they wanted to get him back to give him a chance. OG was with the squad in Germany on a training camp where he played some of the friendly matches. OG revealed, that the coach had told him that he wanted to use him, but the club would prefer to get bigger players to the club, that had played on a higher level than OG had. So he never really got the chance to show himself and left the club on a loan deal.

Loan to Karabükspor
OG was loaned out to Kardemir Karabükspor on 26 August 2015. It was later revealed by the player himself, that he could have chosen to stay at Bursaspor, but he didn't want to take that risk. OG played 24 games and scored four goals, before leaving the club at the end of the season.

Rizespor
OG signed for Süper Lig-side Çaykur Rizespor in the summer 2016. OG scores his first goal in the Süper Lig in April 2017 against Fenerbahçe. His contract got terminated in the summer of 2017.

Adanaspor
On 26 August 2017, OG signed for newly relegated TFF First League club Adanaspor.

Altay SK
Aynaoğlu signed with Altay and joined the club on 1 January 2019.

International career
Oğuzhan was part of the Danish under-20 team that won the 2011 Milk Cup in Northern Ireland.

Career statistics

Club

Honours

National team
 Milk Cup Elite:
 Winners: 2011

References

External links 
 
 
 Profile at DBU.dk 
 

1992 births
Living people
People from Furesø Municipality
Danish men's footballers
Denmark youth international footballers
Danish people of Turkish descent
FC Nordsjælland players
Çaykur Rizespor footballers
Danish Superliga players
Adana Demirspor footballers
Kardemir Karabükspor footballers
Bursaspor footballers
Adanaspor footballers
Altay S.K. footballers
Süper Lig players
TFF First League players
Association football wingers
Sportspeople from the Capital Region of Denmark